Marcus Beresford may refer to:

Marcus Beresford, 1st Earl of Tyrone (1694–1763), Irish MP for Coleraine
Marcus Beresford (Dungarvan MP) (1764–1797), Irish MP for Dungarvan, grandson of the above
Marcus Beresford (British Army officer, born 1764) (1764–1803), British Army general and MP for St Canice and Swords, grandson of the Earl of Tyrone
Marcus Beresford (British Army officer, born 1800) (1800–1876), British Army general and Whig MP for Northallerton and Berwick-upon-Tweed, great-grandson of the Earl of Tyrone
Marcus Beresford (bishop) (1801–1885), Archbishop of Armagh and Primate of All Ireland, great-grandson of the Earl of Tyrone
Marcus Beresford (Conservative politician) (1818–1890), British Conservative politician, MP for Southwark
Lord Marcus Beresford (1848–1922), British equerry and racing manager to King Edward VII, great-great-grandson of the Earl of Tyrone
Marcus Beresford, 7th Baron Decies (born 1948), Anglo-Irish peer, great-great-great-great-grandson of the Earl of Tyrone